Arjunali is a village in the Thane district of Maharashtra, India. It is located in the Bhiwandi taluka. It lies on the Sape-Padgha road.

Demographics 

According to the 2011 census of India, Arjunali has 328 households. The effective literacy rate (i.e. the literacy rate of population excluding children aged 6 and below) is 83.37%.

References 

Villages in Bhiwandi taluka